The H.O.P.E. Beach Volleyball Charity Tournament is a philanthropic volleyball tournament that aims at earning money and gaining awareness on behalf of various charitable organizations. The first tournament took place in the summer of 1989, in Ottawa Ontario at Britania Beach and moved to Mooney's Bay Beach a few years later and continues at Money's Bay Beach today. The tournament is completely nonprofit and is put together by unpaid volunteers. The program normally reaches out to smaller, local charitable organizations. The tournament is held in Canada, on Toronto Island and in Ottawa, Ontario. The acronym H.O.P.E. stands for "Helping Other People Everywhere". The tournaments take place annually during the summer months.

General history
Since the first tournament in 1989, HOPE has raised more than $650,000 for local charities.  Annually the tournament treats to up to six thousand people. The ages range from 18-to mid-40s. To apply for the tournament you must be at least eighteen years old. Teams must have six to ten players. Everyone is guaranteed to play six games, and must pay a three hundred dollar entrance fee. There are six divisions; Beginner, Recreational, Intermediate, Competitive, Corporate Challenge, and New Individuals. Different rules may apply for different divisions. All divisions are separated my amount of experience. The tournament is the largest in southern Ontario and it caters to 400-500 teams annually. The tournament brings people from all parts of Canada and the United States. The event also gets extensive media coverage which has helped it grow and spread its cause extensively throughout its history. Since it is a non-profit organization the charity receives most of its resources and funds solely through donations.

Location
The tournament is located on Toronto Island, Ontario, Canada. To arrive on the island players and family members must take the Queens Quay Ferry and pay a small fee. The island is relatively small and has been chosen for its short distance from Toronto and its view of the city. The island provides a small eatery and a beer garden for the players and their families. These facilities are in no way connected with the charity. The tournament brings people from all parts of Canada and the United States. 

HOPE chose volleyball as its charity because it is the number one amateur sport in Canada. Statistics show that over 800,000 Canadians play volleyball regularly. Volleyball is a very inexpensive sport to play which makes it much easier for every class to become involved in.

Donations and fundraising
To enter the tournament all teams must pay around three hundred dollars. Individual players are required a smaller fee. Individuals may also pledge to donate a set amount annually. All funds that are collected go straight towards the two chosen charities and are in no way used for profit. The tournament raises all of its funds through fees and donations. To emphasize donations the organization has created an incentive program that delivers prizes to the highest donating individuals. A large number of charities have received money from the tournament over its history.

H.O.P.E Volleyball
In junction to the HOPE tournament, the annual summer fest has become a part of the annual HOPE tradition. The fest provides various activities for the players and their families free of cost. The event has live entertainment, vendors, and food. The event is highly publicized which helps to spread knowledge of the tournament as well.

References

External links
 HOPE Volleyball official website

Beach volleyball competitions